Sue Vicory is an American writer, producer and filmmaker and is two-time Emmy nominated and five-time Telly Award winning filmmaker who has received a lifetime achievement award.

Early life and career 
Sue Vicory was born in DeKalb, Illinois. She completed her Master's Degree from Webster University. Sue started her film career at the New York Film Academy in 2003 with her first film "Homelessness & the Power of One". Next Sue directed a feature documentary film, "Kansas City Jazz & Blues; Past, Present & Future" which aired on PBS. In 2011, she directed a short film titled "1898, The W.F. Norman Story". In July 2014, Her fourth film "One" a feature documentary premiered. She created Team XX, a team of 25 women who created the film "Down Stage" which was nominated for a San Diego film award and won a 2016 Telly award. In 2014, she directed a narrative film, "Absent" which won 1st place in the Audience Choice Awards and was also nominated for three awards at the San Diego film festival and won a 2015 Telly Award. She produced "My Power of One" web series Pilot using many of the A-list actors in San Diego. In 2017, Sue worked as an Associate Producer on a reality show "Win Place Show". In 2018 she was included on the panel during Sundance Film Festival representing women filmmakers and she attended a Pre-Oscar event for women & diversity.

In 2019, Vicory co-produced a reality show titled, "Miracle Mob" and as well as the award winning "Jump Start a Life". She & her co-producers won the San Diego Trailblazer award for Jump Start a Life. She is a member of the Alliance of Women Directors based in LA and sits on the Board of Advisors for the San Diego Film Consortium as well as Cottey College. Sue received an Industry Excellence Award at the French Riviera Film Festivals's awards ceremony. Her production company, Heartland Films, Inc. Executive Produced the San Diego film awards which aired on KPBS in May 2021. Vicory presented the My Power of One award and the Best Child Actor award. She received a Lifetime Achievement award from Washburn University. The San Diego film awards have named the Women in Film award the "Sue Vicory Women in Film Award".

Awards 

 Audience Choice Awards
 San Diego film award 
 San Diego Trailblazer award 
 Industry Excellence Award
 Lifetime Achievement award
 Telly Awards

Filmography 

 2022 Athenia's Last Voyage (Documentary) (associate producer) (post-production)
 2021 Original Jayhawk (executive producer) 
 2021 Simple Twist (executive producer) / (producer)
 2021 7th Annual San Diego Film Awards (TV Special) (executive producer)
 2020 She (Documentary) (executive producer)
 2019 Deep In Her Heart (Short) (executive producer)
 2019 Jump Start a Life Telethon (TV Movie) (executive producer) / (line producer) / (producer)
 2018 Intentions (Short) (producer)
 2017 Different Flowers (executive producer - uncredited)
 2016 Aberrant (Short) (executive producer)
 2016 San Diego Film Awards (TV Special) (co-producer)
 2016 Film InDiego (TV Series documentary) (executive producer - 6 episodes)
 2015 The Brazilian Affair (Short) (executive producer)
 2015 Down Stage (Short)
 2015 My Power of One (TV Short)
 2014 Absent (Short)
 2014 One (Documentary)
 2011 1898: The W.F. Norman Story (Documentary short)
 2011 Kansas City Jazz & Blues; Past, Present & Future (Documentary)
 2005 Homelessness and the Power of One (Documentary short)
 2005 Homelessness and the Power of One (Documentary short)
 2017 San Diego Film Awards (TV Special)
 2016 Film InDiego (TV Series documentary)
 2015 San Diego Film Awards (TV Special)

References 

Living people
People from DeKalb, Illinois
Year of birth missing (living people)
21st-century American screenwriters
American film producers
Webster University alumni